In-water survey (referred to by various classification societies as IWS, BIS, etc.) is a method of surveying the underwater parts of a ship while it is still afloat instead of having to dry-dock it for examination of these areas as was conventionally done.

For cargo ships, two surveys are required within a period of five years. One of these can be an in-water survey, provided the ship is eligible for it.

The ship (tanker or bulk carrier) should not be more than 15 years old.
The bottom of the ship should not be painted black before carrying out the survey.

References

 Bureau Veritas Classification e-rules on In-water surveys (INWATERSURVEY) in Rules for the classification of steel ships
 Turkish Classification Society – see Bottom Surveys

Shipbuilding